Caterina Loredan of the noble Loredan family was the Dogaressa of Venice from 1521 to 1523 by marriage to Doge Antonio Grimani. 

Caterina was the sister of the previous Doge of Venice, Leonardo Loredan (r. 1501-1521), whose dogeship is considered one of the most important in the history of the Republic of Venice. She was described in the book The Dogaressas of Venice: The Wives of the Doges by Edgcumbe Staley: “The Loredanian tradition for patriotism and nobility was handed on in the gracious personage of Dogaressa Caterina Loredan, sister of Doge Leonardo Loredan – the Consort of his successor Doge Antonio Grimani.” 

Caterina Loredan and Doge Antonio Grimani had five sons: Cardinal Domenico Grimani (1461-1523), Girolamo Grimani (1466-1515), Piero Grimani (1466-1517), Marino Grimani and Vincenzo Grimani (d. 1535).

She is mentioned as the sister of Doge Leonardo Loredan (and hence daughter of Gerolamo Loredan) in some sources, although she may have been a daughter of Domenico Loredan.

Ancestry 

Note:  The branch of Santo Stefano is also known as the branch of San Vidal (San Vitale).

Note: There are some generations missing between Girolamo Loredan (1468-1532) and Francesco Loredan (17th century).

Note: Giustina Giustiniani (d. 1500), the wife of Doge Leonardo Loredan (1436-1521), is also known as Morosina Giustiniani.

Note: Caterina Loredan, Dogaressa of Venice, is featured in the family tree as the daughter of Gerolamo Loredan (d. 1474) and Donata Donà because, in some sources, she is mentioned as the sister of Doge Leonardo Loredan (1436-1521), although she may have been a daughter of Domenico Loredan.

Interestingly, near the Palazzo Contarini-Sceriman and the nearby bridge, Leonardo Loredan (d. 1675) was found dead in a boat. The unexplained death was the source of many rumors, claiming accidental death, murder by relatives, or murder by the Inquisitors of the Republic.

Andrea Loredan (d. 1750) died young, thus ending the male (agnatic) line of the branch of Santo Stefano.

References 

C
16th-century Venetian people
16th-century Venetian women